Gauhati Commerce College located at R.G. Barooah Road in Guwahati.  It is a government  college affiliated to the Department Of Commerce of Gauhati University in Assam. It was founded in early of 1962 by the government of Assam.

References 

Commerce colleges in India
Universities and colleges in Guwahati
Colleges affiliated to Gauhati University
Educational institutions established in 1962
1962 establishments in Assam